Taffy Brodesser-Akner (born Stephanie Akner) is an American journalist and author.  She has worked freelance and as a contributor for GQ and The New York Times, where she is now a staff writer.  Her profiles of celebrities have won her the New York Press Club Award and Mirror Award. Her first novel, Fleishman Is in Trouble, achieved widespread success.

Personal life 
Born Stephanie Akner, Brodesser-Akner received the nickname "Taffy" at a young age and continued using it professionally.  She grew up in Brooklyn, New York, in an Orthodox Jewish household. She attended New York University.

She married Claude Brodesser in 2006.  Brodesser converted to Judaism and eventually grew more observant than his wife.  After marrying, both took hyphenated last names. They have two children.

Career

Journalism 
Brodesser-Akner's first major journalism job was at Soap Opera Weekly, a job she held until her role was eliminated due to layoffs in June 2001.  She also wrote for Mediabistro and did freelance pieces for magazines including ESPN The Magazine, GQ, and Texas Monthly.  The Columbia Journalism Review called her "one of the nation's most successful freelance writers".  Her freelance articles often focused on celebrity profiles, several of which went viral.  In 2014, she became a contributing writer to both The New York Times and GQ.  In 2017, she became a full-time staff writer for The New York Times.

In 2014, Brodesser-Akner won a New York Press Club Award for entertainment news in a magazine for her story about actress Gaby Hoffmann.  She won two New York Press Club awards in 2015, for her profiles of Damon Lindelof and Britney Spears.  The same year, Brodesser-Akner was nominated for a Mirror Award for her profile of Joey Soloway, and she won the award in 2016 for her profile of broadcaster Don Lemon.

Fiction and television 
Her first novel, Fleishman Is in Trouble, was published in June 2019 by Random House in the US and by Wildfire in the UK. The novel was selected for the longlist for the Women's Prize for Fiction 2020. Brodesser-Akner has adapted the novel as a TV miniseries, which debuted on Hulu on November 17, 2022.

References

External links 
 

Living people
People from Huntington, New York
21st-century American journalists
The New York Times writers
Jewish American journalists
Jewish women writers
New York University alumni
Year of birth missing (living people)
21st-century American Jews
21st-century American novelists
21st-century American women writers
Novelists from New York (state)
Journalists from New York (state)